The Women's coxless pair competition at the 2012 Summer Olympics in London took place at Dorney Lake which, for the purposes of the Games venue, is officially termed Eton Dorney.

Schedule

All times are British Summer Time (UTC+1)

Results

Heats
First two of each heat qualify to the final, remainder goes to the repechage.

Heat 1

Heat 2

Repechage
First two qualify to the final.

Finals
Note: Strong headwinds

Final B

Final A

References

Women's coxless pair
Women's coxless pair